Qanita Jalil (born 21 March 1982) is a Pakistani former cricketer who played as a right-arm fast-medium bowler and right-handed batter. She appeared in 66 One Day Internationals and 51 Twenty20 Internationals for Pakistan between 2005 and 2015. She played domestic cricket for Peshawar, Abbottabad and Zarai Taraqiati Bank Limited.

References

External links
 
 

Jalil, Qanita
Jalil, Qanita
Cricketers from Abbottabad
Pakistani women cricketers
Pakistan women One Day International cricketers
Pakistan women Twenty20 International cricketers
Peshawar women cricketers
Abbottabad women cricketers
Zarai Taraqiati Bank Limited women cricketers
Asian Games medalists in cricket
Cricketers at the 2014 Asian Games
Asian Games gold medalists for Pakistan
Medalists at the 2014 Asian Games